Andrey Vladimirovich Perederiy (born 3 August 1974) is a Russian professional football official, coach and a former player. He is the team director with FC Alania Vladikavkaz.

Career
As a player, he made his debut in the Russian Second Division in 1991 for FC Avtodor Vladikavkaz. He later played 2 seasons in the Russian Football National League for Avtodor. Record holder of the club by the number of matches played and his best scorer of all time (346 games, 104 goals).

References

External links
 Осетины в футбольной Премьер-лиге

1974 births
Sportspeople from Vladikavkaz
Living people
Soviet footballers
Russian footballers
Association football midfielders
Association football forwards
FC Sodovik Sterlitamak players
Russian football managers
FC Olimpia Volgograd players
Russian football chairmen and investors
FC Mashuk-KMV Pyatigorsk players